Vincent H. Resh (born 1945) is an American entomologist who primarily researches aquatic insects and medical entomology. He was the co-editor of the Annual Review of Entomology from 1991–1997.

Early life and education
Vincent H. Resh was born in 1945.
Resh grew up in New York and attended Iona Preparatory School. His father, Lewis J. Resh, worked for John Lowry, Inc. in New York City. His mother's name was Ann.
He attended Georgetown University for his bachelor's degree, graduating in 1967. He then attended Niagara University for his master's degree in 1969 and the University of Louisville for his PhD in 1973.

Career
Resh's first teaching appointment was as an assistant professor at Ball State University, where he worked from 1973 to 1975.  He then accepted an assistant professorship at the University of California, Berkeley in 1975. He was made an associate professor in 1979 and a full professor in 1984. From 2007–2008 he was the chair of the Division of Organisms and the Environment within Berkeley's Department of Environmental Science. He was the director of the Richard B. Gump South Pacific Biological Research Station at Mo'orea from 1996–2001. His research is primarily focused on the evolutionary biology and ecology of aquatic insects invertebrates like insects, crustaceans, and molluscs. He also researches how humans can modify or influence aquatic environments to control aquatic disease vectors and how aquatic invertebrate community composition can be used as a proxy for water quality.

For fifteen years, he served on the World Health Organization's River Blindness Control Program. He was the president of the North American Benthological Society from 1983–1984, on the board of trustees of the Marine Science Institute from 1992–1997, and co-editor of the Annual Review of Entomology from 1991–1997. Resh was also one of the editors of the 2003 Encyclopedia of Insects, which was awarded the Most Outstanding Single-Volume Reference in Science by the Association of American Publishers and Best of Reference by the New York Public Library and Library Journal.

Awards and honors
He was elected as a fellow of the California Academy of Sciences in 1995, and the University of Lyon gave him an honorary doctor in 2009. In 2017 he was one of the inaugural fellows of the Society for Freshwater Science.

References

1945 births
Living people
Georgetown University alumni
Niagara University alumni
University of Louisville alumni
Ball State University faculty
University of California, Berkeley faculty
American entomologists
Presidents of the Society for Freshwater Science
Annual Reviews (publisher) editors